Pedro Daniel Galvão (born 28 September 1984) is an American born, Portuguese professional footballer who plays for New York Cosmos as a defender or midfielder.

Club career

FC Edmonton
Galvão made his debut on July 27, 2016, coming on as a substitute in a 2–1 victory over the New York Cosmos.

Penn FC
On February 23, 2018, Galvão was signed to Penn FC of the United Soccer League.

New York Cosmos
On January 31, 2019, Galvão signed with the New York Cosmos B for the club's seasons in the National Premier Soccer League and the NPSL Founders Cup. In 2020, he signed for the first team ahead of its first season in the National Independent Soccer Association.

Career statistics

Club

Notes

References

External links
 Gil Vicente Profile

1989 births
Living people
Soccer players from Connecticut
Sportspeople from Waterbury, Connecticut
Portuguese footballers
Association football defenders
Association football midfielders
Liga Portugal 2 players
Segunda Divisão players
North American Soccer League players
USL Championship players
National Premier Soccer League players
National Independent Soccer Association players
S.L. Benfica footballers
Associação Académica de Coimbra – O.A.F. players
G.D. Tourizense players
C.D. Fátima players
Sertanense F.C. players
Gil Vicente F.C. players
FC Edmonton players
Penn FC players
New York Cosmos B players
New York Cosmos (2010) players